Wake Up America Day was celebrated on April 19, 1917 in New York City to coincide with Patriots' Day. It was designed to boost recruiting for World War I. James Montgomery Flagg designed the posters and the floats in the parade.  Jean Earle Mohle dressed as Paul Revere and rode a horse.

References

1917 in New York City
World War I propaganda
United States home front during World War I